This article provides a list of social thinkers.

The title social thinker denotes a person who is acknowledged as a visionary for social advancement.



B
 Dharamvir Bharati
 Subhash Chandra Bose
 Jacob Burckhardt

D
 Lloyd deMause
 Dr. Bhimrao Ramji Ambedkar

G
 Mahatma Gandhi
 Maurice Glasman, Baron Glasman
 Ziya Gökalp

H
 Spencer Heath

I
 Ivan Illich
 Muhammad Iqbal

J
 Jose Rizal

K
 Rajani Kannepalli Kanth

M
 Karl Marx

N
Vartika Nanda
Shankar Guha Niyogi

O
 Adriano Olivetti

P
 Kesari Balakrishna Pillai
 Caroline Pratt

R
 Jean-Jacques Rousseau
 John Ruskin

S
Henri de Saint-Simon
George Bernard Shaw
Rudolf Steiner

T
Debendranath Tagore
R. H. Tawney

U
 Roberto Mangabeira Unger

V
Thorstein Veblen

Y
Ivan Yefremov

Lists of social scientists
Thinkers